Michael Karickhoff is an American politician and member of the Indiana House of Representatives, representing the 30th District since 2010. Prior to his election to the state legislature, Karickhoff, a member of the Republican Party, was a Kokomo, Indiana Councilman. He was endorsed and recruited by Governor Mitch Daniels to run for Representative in the 2010 Indiana elections.

References

External links
Representative Michael Karickhoff official Indiana State Legislature site
 
Michael Karickhoff at Ballotpedia

1956 births
21st-century American politicians
Living people
Republican Party members of the Indiana House of Representatives
University of Missouri alumni